The 1927 season of the Paraguayan Primera División, the top category of Paraguayan football, was played by 10 teams. The national champions were Olimpia.

Results

Standings

External links
Paraguay 1927 season at RSSSF

Paraguayan Primera División seasons
Para
Primera